Eulophonotus armstrongi is a moth in the family Cossidae. It is found in Ghana and Sierra Leone. The larvae feed on Coffea arabica.

References

Natural History Museum Lepidoptera generic names catalog

Zeuzerinae